WHZR 103.7 FM is a radio station broadcasting a country music format. Licensed to Royal Center, Indiana, the station serves the areas of Logansport, Indiana and Peru, Indiana, and is owned by James Allan Schliemann, through licensee Iron Horse Broadcasting, LLC. Hoosier Country's most popular shows include Lunch With Lowe, weekdays from 11 a.m.- 1 p.m...an all request country music show featuring songs 25 years of age and newer. The Roots of Hoosier Country hosted by Dale Lowe is an all request show from 6-11 a.m. on Saturday mornings, it features songs of the classical era of country music.

References

External links
WHZR's official website

HZR